Data sharing is the practice of making data used for scholarly research available to other investigators. Many funding agencies, institutions, and publication venues have policies regarding data sharing because transparency and openness are considered by many to be part of the scientific method.

A number of funding agencies and science journals require authors of peer-reviewed papers to share any supplemental information (raw data, statistical methods or source code) necessary to understand, develop or reproduce published research. A great deal of scientific research is not subject to data sharing requirements, and many of these policies have liberal exceptions. In the absence of any binding requirement, data sharing is at the discretion of the scientists themselves. In addition, in certain situations governments and institutions prohibit or severely limit data sharing to protect proprietary interests, national security, and subject/patient/victim confidentiality. Data sharing may also be restricted to protect institutions and scientists from use of data for political purposes.

Data and methods may be requested from an author years after publication. In order to encourage data sharing and prevent the loss or corruption of data, a number of funding agencies and journals established policies on data archiving. Access to publicly archived data is a recent development in the history of science made possible by technological advances in communications and information technology. To take full advantage of modern rapid communication may require consensual agreement on the criteria underlying mutual recognition of respective contributions. Models recognized for improving the timely sharing of data for more effective response to emergent infectious disease threats include the data sharing mechanism introduced by the GISAID Initiative.

Despite policies on data sharing and archiving, data withholding still happens. Authors may fail to archive data or they only archive a portion of the data. Failure to archive data alone is not data withholding. When a researcher requests additional information, an author sometimes refuses to provide it. When authors withhold data like this, they run the risk of losing the trust of the science community. A 2022 study identified about 3500 research papers which contained statements that the data was available, but upon request and further seeking the data, found that it was unavailable for 94% of papers.

Data sharing may also indicate the sharing of personal information on a social media platform.

U.S. government policies

Federal law
On August 9, 2007, President Bush signed the America COMPETES Act (or the "America Creating Opportunities to Meaningfully Promote Excellence in Technology, Education, and Science Act") requiring civilian federal agencies to provide guidelines, policies and procedures, to facilitate and optimize the open exchange of data and research between agencies, the public and policymakers. See Section 1009.

NIH data sharing policy

The NIH Final Statement of Sharing of Research Data says:

NSF Policy from Grant General Conditions

Office of Research Integrity
Allegations of misconduct in medical research carry severe consequences. The United States Department of Health and Human Services established an office to oversee investigations of allegations of misconduct, including data withholding. The website defines the mission:

Ideals in data sharing
Some research organizations feel particularly strongly about data sharing. Stanford University's WaveLab has a philosophy about reproducible research and disclosing all algorithms and source code necessary to reproduce the research. In a paper titled "WaveLab and Reproducible Research," the authors describe some of the problems they encountered in trying to reproduce their own research after a period of time. In many cases, it was so difficult they gave up the effort. These experiences are what convinced them of the importance of disclosing source code. The philosophy is described:
The idea is: An article about computational science in a scientific publication is not the scholarship itself, it is merely advertising of the scholarship. The actual scholarship is the complete software development environment and the complete set of instructions which generated the figures.

The Data Observation Network for Earth (DataONE) and Data Conservancy are projects supported by the National Science Foundation to encourage and facilitate data sharing among research scientists and better support meta-analysis. In environmental sciences, the research community is recognizing that major scientific advances involving integration of knowledge in and across fields will require that researchers overcome not only the technological barriers to data sharing but also the historically entrenched institutional and sociological barriers.  Dr. Richard J. Hodes, director of the National Institute on Aging has stated, "the old model in which researchers jealously guarded their data is no longer applicable".

The Alliance for Taxpayer Access is a group of organizations that support open access to government sponsored research. The group has expressed a "Statement of Principles" explaining why they believe open access is important. They also list a number of international public access policies.  This is no more so than in timely communication of essential information to effectively respond to health emergencies. While public domain archives have been embraced for depositing data, mainly post formal publication, they have failed to encourage rapid data sharing during health emergencies, among them the Ebola and Zika, outbreaks. More clearly defined principles are required to recognize the interests of those generating the data while permitting free, unencumbered access to and use of the data (pre-publication) for research and practical application, such as those adopted by the GISAID Initiative to counter emergent threats from influenza.

International policies
Australia
Austria
 Europe — Commission of European Communities
Germany
United Kingdom
 'Omic Data Sharing — a list of policies of major science funders FAIRsharing.org Catalogue of Data Policies
 India -National Data Sharing and Accessibility Policy – Government of India

Data sharing problems in academia

Genetics
Withholding of data has become so commonplace in genetics that researchers at Massachusetts General Hospital published a journal article on the subject. The study found that "Because they were denied access to data, 28% of geneticists reported that they had been unable to confirm published research."

Psychology
In a 2006 study, it was observed that, of 141 authors of a publication from the American Psychological Association (APA) empirical articles, 103 (73%) did not respond with their data over a 6-month period. In a follow up study published in 2015, it was found that 246 out of 394 contacted authors of papers in APA journals did not share their data upon request (62%).

Archaeology
A 2018 study reported on study of a random sample of 48 articles published during February–May 2017 in the Journal of Archaeological Science which found openly available raw data for 18 papers (53%), with compositional and dating data being the most frequently shared types. The same study also emailed authors of articles on experiments with stone artifacts that were published during 2009 and 2015 to request data relating to the publications. They contacted the authors of 23 articles and received 15 replies, resulting in a 70% response rate. They received five responses that included data files, giving an overall sharing rate of 20%.

Scientists in training
A study of scientists in training indicated many had already experienced data withholding. This study has given rise to the fear the future generation of scientists will not abide by the established practices.

Differing approaches in different fields
Requirements for data sharing are more commonly imposed by institutions, funding agencies, and publication venues in the medical and biological sciences than in the physical sciences. Requirements vary widely regarding whether data must be shared at all, with whom the data must be shared, and who must bear the expense of data sharing.

Funding agencies such as the NIH and NSF tend to require greater sharing of data, but even these requirements tend to acknowledge the concerns of patient confidentiality, costs incurred in sharing data, and the legitimacy of the request. Private interests and public agencies with national security interests (defense and law enforcement) often discourage sharing of data and methods through non-disclosure agreements.

Data sharing poses specific challenges in participatory monitoring initiatives, for example where forest communities collect data on local social and environmental conditions. In this case, a rights-based approach to the development of data-sharing protocols can be based on principles of free, prior and informed consent, and prioritise the protection of the rights of those who generated the data, and/or those potentially affected by data-sharing.

See also
Data archive
Data dissemination
Data privacy
Data publishing
Data citation
FAIR data
File sharing
Information sharing
Open data
Registry of Research Data Repositories

References

Literature

 — discusses the international exchange of data in the natural sciences.

External links
 "The Selfish Gene : Data Sharing and Withholding in Academic Genetics" by Eric Campbell and David Blumenthal published May 31, 2002.
 Data sharing and data archiving ― American Psychological Association
 The Public Domain of Digital Research Data
 WaveLab and Reproducible Research by Jonathan B. Buckheit and David L. Donoho of Stanford University 
 The Role of Data and Program Code Archives in the Future of Economic Research published by The Federal Reserve Bank of St. Louis
 Ecological Society of America data sharing and archiving initiative 
 FAIRsharing.org A website on data sharing and data policies in biology
 UK Data Archive: Manage and Share data
 Data Management Plan Resources and Examples - Inter-university Consortium for Political and Social Research.
 DataONE
 Nature Scientific Data: open-access, online-only publication for descriptions of scientifically valuable datasets.

Data
Scientific method
Scholarly communication
Academic publishing

Open access (publishing)
Open data
Open science
Scientific misconduct
Sharing